OGLE-2005-BLG-169Lb is an extrasolar planet located approximately  away in the constellation of Sagittarius, orbiting the star OGLE-2005-BLG-169L. This planet was discovered by the OGLE project using the gravitational microlensing method. Based on a most likely mass for the host star of 0.49 solar mass, the planet has a mass of 13 times that of Earth. Its mass and estimated temperature are close to those of Uranus. It is speculated that this planet may either be an ice giant like Uranus, or a "naked super-Earth" with a solid icy or rocky surface.

See also

 OGLE-2005-BLG-390Lb
 Optical Gravitational Lensing Experiment (OGLE)

References

External links 
 
 
  

Sagittarius (constellation)
Exoplanets discovered in 2006
Giant planets
Exoplanets detected by microlensing

es:OGLE-2005-BLG-169L#OGLE-2005-BLG-169Lb